All for Love (lit. "The Most Beautiful Week of My Life"; also known as My Lovely Week) is a 2005 South Korean romance ensemble film. It was Min Kyu-dong's solo directorial debut. The film was the 10th highest grossing Korean production of 2005 with 2,533,103 sold nationwide.

A week passes in Seoul, with a diverse group of couples and singles experiencing love or tragedy in strong doses. Broken families and newly formed marriages, struggles with debt or with an uneasy conscience, conflict and resolution, sickness and health, newly discovered love, the resurfacing of old relationships...

Plot
A lovely week in the lives of these people.

An elderly woman (Oh Mi-hee) rents a coffee shop from a gruff theater owner (Joo Hyun).

A newlywed couple crushed by debt and desperate for work, the down-on-his-luck salesman (Im Chang-jung) hides the fact that he sells trinkets on the subway from his wife (Seo Young-hee).

A bill collector (Kim Su-ro) who is fed up with his job is then offered a spot on a local reality television show to relive his college basketball days and also fulfill the wish of a terminally ill girl (Kim Yoo-jung).

A tightly wound, divorced father (Chun Ho-jin) works in the music industry. He is struggling to raise his son, and needs to find a maid.

His ex-wife (Uhm Jung-hwa) is a fiery spirited psychiatrist, who has perhaps met her match with a rough-and-tumble cop (Hwang Jung-min).

A famous male pop singer (Jung Kyung-ho) becomes stricken with a mysterious illness after his contract is cancelled by the music executive. He meets a young nun (Yoon Jin-seo) who tried to kill herself due to her strong feelings for him.

Cast

Uhm Jung-hwa as Hur Yu-jung
Hwang Jung-min as  Na Do-chul
Im Chang-jung as Kim Chang-hoo
Seo Young-hee as  Ha Seon-ae
Kim Su-ro as  Park Sung-won
Kim Yoo-jung as Kim Jin-a
Yoon Jin-seo as Im Soo-kyung
Jung Kyung-ho as Yu Jung-hun
Joo Hyun as Mr. Kwak
Oh Mi-hee as Oh Yeo-in
Chun Ho-jin as Jo Jae-kyung
Kim Tae-hyun as Min Tae-hyun
Kim Yoon-seok as Dong-man
Jung Yoon-min as Det. Lee
Hwang Hyo-eun as Nurse Kim
Lee Byeong-jun as Jo Ji-seok
Ha Ji-won as Yun-joo (cameo)
Ryu Seung-soo as assistant director (cameo)
Jo Hee-bong as cameo
Lee Se-young as actress Jasmine (cameo)
Woo Hyun as cameo
Lee Hwan as pickpocket (cameo)
Jeon Hye-jin
Park Jin-woo 
Shin Sung-rok
Han Sang-jin as youngest detective
Kim Dong-wook
Park Jeong-sun

Awards and nominations
2005 Chunsa Film Art Awards
 Best Supporting Actress - Oh Mi-hee
 Best New Actor - Kim Tae-hyun
 Best New Actress - Seo Young-hee
 Best Screenplay - Yu Seong-hyeop and Min Kyu-dong
 Best Planning/Producer - Oh Jeong-wan, Lee Yoo-jin
 Special Jury Prize - Min Kyu-dong

2005 Blue Dragon Film Awards
 Nomination - Best Supporting Actress - Seo Young-hee
 Nomination - Best Screenplay - Yu Seong-hyeop and Min Kyu-dong
 Nomination - Best Visual Effects

2005 Korean Film Awards
 Best Editing - Moon In-dae

2006 Grand Bell Awards
 Nomination - Best Director - Min Kyu-dong
 Nomination - Best Screenplay - Yu Seong-hyeop and Min Kyu-dong
 Nomination - Best New Actor - Jung Kyung-ho
 Nomination - Best New Actress - Kim Yoo-jung

References

External links 
 https://web.archive.org/web/20120111212537/http://www.lovelyweek.co.kr/
 
 
 

2005 films
2000s Korean-language films
South Korean romance films
Films directed by Min Kyu-dong
2005 directorial debut films
2000s South Korean films